George Perpich may refer to:
 George Perpich (American football), American football player
 George F. Perpich, American dentist and politician